A constitutional referendum was held in Cuba on 15 February 1976, the first nationwide vote on the island since the Cuban Revolution. The new constitution was reportedly discussed at grass-roots level by 6,216,000 citizens, resulting in 60 of the 141 articles being modified. It was approved by 99.02% of voters with a turnout of 98%.

Results

References

1976 referendums
Referendums in Cuba
1976 in Cuba
Constitutional referendums
February 1976 events in North America